SS Canonesa was a refrigerated cargo steamship that was built in Ireland in 1920 and sunk by a u-boat in the Atlantic Ocean in 1940.

Furness, Houlder Argentine Lines owned and operated her throughout her career. This was a joint venture between Furness, Withy and Houlder Line to carry chilled and frozen meat and other produce from South America to the United Kingdom.

This was the company's second ship to be called Canonesa. The first was a steamship that was launched in 1893 as Buteshire, renamed Bollington Grange in 1915, renamed Canonesa in 1916 and Magicstar in 1919.

Building and technical details
She had a single screw powered by a pair of steam turbines via double reduction gearing.

Canonesas UK official number was 143660. Her code letters were KGQB until they were superseded in 1934 by the call sign GKCM.

Second World War
In the Second World War Canonesa took part in convoys including SLF 22 from Freetown in Sierra Leone to Liverpool in March 1940 and SLF 38 from Freetown to Liverpool in July 1940.

In September 1940 Canonesa left Sydney, Nova Scotia carrying 7,265 tons of refrigerated and general cargo, including 2,258 tons of bacon, 955 tons of cheese, 379 tons of fish and 250 tons of ham. She joined Convoy HX 72, which had left Halifax, Nova Scotia on 9 September and was bound for Liverpool.

HX 72 had only one escort, the AMC . On 20 September Jervis Bay left HX 72 to escort a westbound convoy, and on the night of 20–21 September a u-boat wolf pack attacked HX 72.

At 2310 hrs on 21 September  joined the attack by firing a spread of torpedoes at HX 72, hitting Canonesa and two other ships. The   rescued 62 survivors.

Wreck
It is in what are now the territorial waters of the Republic of Ireland. Ireland's National Monuments Service records it as wreck number W09516.

References

Bibliography

1920 ships
Maritime incidents in September 1940
Ships built in Belfast
Ships sunk by German submarines in World War II
Shipwrecks of Ireland
Standard World War I ships
Steamships of the United Kingdom
World War II merchant ships of the United Kingdom
World War II shipwrecks in the Atlantic Ocean